Alberto Siliotti is a scientific journalist, writer and photographer. For more than 20 years, he studied history, archeology and the natural environment of Egypt, where he started to work in 1988 as the director of the Horus mission, led by the Italian ministry of foreign affairs who wanted to relate the itineraries of the Italian travelers of the 19th century – especially Giovanni Battista Belzoni who discovered the entry of Chepren pyramid and Sethi I tomb in the king valley. He has made for the British Museum, a scholarly edition of Belzoni's travels, among plenty of objects recovered in Egypt are part of the museum collections.

He led several scientific expeditions in the Egyptian Sahara for the art and the prehistorical life in the pharaohs country, and other missions into Egyptian oasis.

Member of the Egypt Exploration Society and the Egyptian Geographic Society, he is the author of about 30 books and guides translated in several languages and published by AUC Press, WhiteStar, Grund and Geodia Editions.

He made the first topographic maps of the national park of the Gilf Kebir and of the White desert.

Since 2000, he collaborated with the American University in Cairo and created the famous pocket guides collection, 14 titles in 4 languages.

Expert of the International Union for Conservation of Nature, he made the Fayoum and wadi El Rayan guide and the  Gilf Kebir National Park guide for the Development cooperation of the Italian Embassy.

Passionate for the red sea, Alberto Siliotti has studied the fauna, the coral reefs and its natural environment preservation. He is the author of a red sea fish guide, a book concerning the most famous wrecks of the red sea, and the Sinai dive guide, prized in 2005 by the Underwater Film Festival of Antibes.

He is currently the director of Geodia Editions.

Books
1994, Egypt Splendors of an Ancient Civilization, Thames and Hudson Ltd, 
1998, Egypt Lost and Found, Explorers and Travelers on the Nile, Thames and Hudson Ltd, 
2000, Dwellings of Eternity, Barnes & Nobles Books, 
2000, Guide to the Pyramids of Egypt, White Star S.r.l., 
2001, Belzoni's Travels, The British Museum Press, 
2004, Guide to the Valley of the Kings, White Star S.r.l., 
2008, Hidden treasures of antiquity, White Star S.r.l.,

Egypt pocket guides
2000, Sinai (GB), The American University in Cairo Press, 
2000, Abu Simbel and The Nubian Temples, The American University in Cairo Press,  
2000, Islamic Cairo, The American University in Cairo Press,  
2002, Alexandria and the North Coast, The American University in Cairo Press,  
2002, Luxor, Karnak, and the Theban Temples, The American University in Cairo Press,  
2002, The Pyramids, The American University in Cairo Press, 
2002, The Valley of the Kings and the Theban Temples, The American University in Cairo Press,  
2002, Aswan, The American University in Cairo Press, 
2003, The Fayoum and Wadi el-Rayan, The American University in Cairo Press, 
2007, The Oases, The American University in Cairo Press, 
2008, Coptic Egypt, The American University in Cairo Press, 
2008, Saint Catherine the Monastery and its Territory, Geodia 
2009, Gilf Kebir National Park, Geodia, 
2010, Medinet Madi Archeological Guide (edited by), Geodia,

Red Sea and Sinai
2002, Fishes of the Red Sea, Geodia, 
2004, The Red Sea, the coral garden, Geodia,  
2005, Sinai Diving Guide (ENG), Geodia, 
2008, The Great Shipwrecks of the Red Sea, Geodia,

Maps
2008, Map of the White Desert National Park, Geodia
2009, Map of the Gilf Kebir National Park, Geodia 
2010, Map of the Western Desert – Oases of Egypt, Geodia,

References

1950 births
Living people
Italian male writers
Italian photographers
Writers from Verona